"Tonight's the Night" is the second single from Little Birdy's debut album BigBigLove and was released 29 November 2004 by Eleven and distributed by Virgin/EMI. The song appeared at No. 76 on the ARIA Singles Chart Top 100. Like the other tracks on the album it was produced by Paul McKercher at Big Jesus Burger Studios and mixed at Studios 301.

The single's title track proves Katy Steele's knack for penning Bacharach-esque hooks is undeniable .. they sound classic but not retro.

"Tonight's the Night" features the addition of a fifth member, guitarist and keyboardist Fergus Deasy (touring guitarist with Eskimo Joe). Accompanying the single is two remixes of Losing You and a demo of Forever - the original versions of which both appear on BigBigLove. The Blurb's Evan Alexander, described the song as "a fair offering from this newly hyped Perth four piece [and its] jingle jangle chords punctuate a stuttered intro before Katy Steele’s breathy vocal kick the forefront in". In an interview with the Sydney Morning Herald, guitarist, Simon Leach, describes the song as old school with a 1980s influence.

"Tonight's the Night" reached No. 78 on the Triple J Hottest 100 for 2004.

Track listing

Charts

Release history

References

External links
 "Tonight's the Night" on YouTube

2004 singles
Little Birdy songs
2004 songs
Eleven: A Music Company singles
Songs written by Katy Steele